Vivian (and variants such as Vivien and Vivienne) is a given name, and less often a surname, derived from a Latin name of the Roman Empire period, masculine Vivianus and feminine Viviana, which survived into modern use because it is the name of two early Christian female martyrs as well as of a male saint and bishop.

History and variants
The Latin name Vivianus is recorded from the 1st century. It is ultimately related to the adjective vivus "alive", but it is formed from the compound form vivi- and the adjectival  suffix used to form cognomina.

The latinate given name Vivianus was of limited popularity in the medieval period in reference to Saint Vivianus, a 5th-century bishop of Saintes; the feminine name was that of Saint Viviana (Bibiana), a 4th-century martyr whose veneration in Rome is ascertained for the 5th century.

In Arthurian legend, Vivian in its various spellings is one of the names of the Lady of the Lake.

The name was brought to England with the Norman invasion, and is occasionally recorded in England in the 12th and 13th centuries. The masculine given name appears with greater frequency in the early modern period. The spelling Vivian was historically used only as a masculine name, and is still used as such in the UK with this spelling, but in the 19th century was also given to girls and was a unisex name until the early part of the 20th century; since the mid 20th century, it has been almost exclusively given as a feminine name in the United States. Use of Vivian as a feminine name peaked in popularity in the United States in 1920 at rank 64, but declined in the second half of the 20th century, falling below rank 500 in the 1980s. Its popularity has again picked up somewhat since the 1990s, as of 2012 having attained rank 140.

Variants of the feminine name include Viviana, Viviane, and Vivienne. The French feminine spelling Vivienne in the United States rose sharply in recent years from below rank 1,000 (no statistical record) to rank 322 in the period 2009–2012. The Italian or Latin form Viviana has enjoyed some popularity since the 1990s, reaching rank 322 in 2000. The spelling Vivien is the French masculine form, but in English speaking countries it has long been used as a feminine form, due to its appearance as the name of the Arthurian Lady of the Lake in Tennyson's Idylls of the King of 1859. For the masculine name, the variant Vyvyan has sometimes been used, based on the Cornish surname itself derived from the given name. The intermediary form Vyvian is also occasionally found.

The Gaelic name Ninian has sometimes been identified as a corruption of Vivian, but it is now considered more likely derived from Welsh Nynniaw, which is itself of uncertain origin, but likely renders Nennius. Bébinn is an unrelated, genuinely Gaelic name which has on occasion been rendered as Vivian in English.

As a surname
The given name Vivian was introduced to Norman England in the 11th or 12th century and over time gave rise to a variety of British surnames, including Videan, Vidgen, Vidgeon, Fiddian, Fidgeon, Phythian, Phethean.

The Vyvyan family has been a prominent family of Cornwall since the 16th century. The Vyvyan baronetcy was created in the Baronetage of England for Sir Richard Vyvyan in 1645. Baron Vivian was created in the Peerage of the United Kingdom in 1841.

Notable bearers of the surname include:
 C. T. Vivian (1924–2020), American minister and author
 Herbert Vivian (1865-1940), British journalist and leader of the Neo-Jacobite Revival
 Ivor Vivian (born 1933), Australian politician
 Jennifer Vyvyan (1925-1974) English classical soprano singer
 John Lambrick Vivian (1830–1896), genealogist of Devon and Cornwall
 Joseph Vivien (1657–1735), French painter
 Renée Vivien (1877–1909), British poet in the French language
 Weston E. Vivian (1924–2020), American politician
 William Vyvyan, 14th-century English MP

List of individuals with the name

Masculine given name

Vivian
 Vivian Anderson (born 1956), English football coach and defender
 Vivian Balakrishnan (born 1961), Singaporean politician
 Vivian Bendall (born 1938), English Conservative politician
 Vivian Blake (1956–2010), Jamaican criminal
 Vivian Blake (politician) (1921–2000), Jamaican politician and chief justice of the Bahamas
 Vivian Bose (1891–1983), judge of the Supreme Court of India
 Vivian de Buffrénil (born 1950), French histologist and palaeobiologist
 Vivian Campbell (born 1962), Northern Irish heavy metal guitarist
 Vivian Cook (linguist) (born 1940), English linguist and professor of Applied Linguistics at Newcastle University
 Vivian Crawford (1879–1922), English first-class cricketer
 Vivian Dsena (born 1988), Indian TV actor
 Vivian Ellis (1904–1996), English musical comedy composer
 Vivian Frederick Maynard FitzSimons (1901–1975), South African herpetologist
 Sir Vivian Fuchs (1908–1999), English explorer to first cross Antarctica overland
 Vivian Hunter Galbraith (1889–1976), English historian and Regius Professor of Modern History at Oxford University|Oxford
 Vivian H. H. Green (1915–2005), rector of Lincoln College, Oxford, and inspiration for John le Carré's character George Smiley
 Vivian Harris (born 1978), Guyanese boxer
 Vivian Wilson Henderson (1923–1976), American educator and human rights activist
 Vivian Imerman (born 1955), South African businessman and former CEO of Del Monte Foods
 Vivian Jackson (1946–2010), Jamaican reggae musician also known as Yabby You
 Clive Vivian Leopold James (Clive James, 1939–2019), Australian author
 Sir Vivian Naylor-Leyland, 3rd Baronet (1924–1987), British aristocrat and banker
 Viv Richards (born 1952), Antiguan cricketer and sports commentator
 Vivian Roy Stanley Schokman (1887-1953), Sri Lankan Burgher politician and physician
 Major General Vivian Street (1912–1970), British army officer, also known for his charitable work, particularly as chairman of the Save the Children fund
 Vivian Van Damm (1895–1960), English impresario of the Windmill Theatre, London
 Vivian Wineman (born 1950), commercial lawyer, president of the Board of Deputies of British Jews 2009–2015
 Vivian Woodward (1879–1954), English centre forward footballer

Vivien
 Vivien Thomas (1910–1985), American surgical technician

Vyvyan
 Vyvyan Adams (1900–1951), British Conservative Party politician
 Vyvyan Donnithorne (1886–1968), British Anglican missionary to China
 Vyvyan Evans, professor of Linguistics
 Vyvyan Evelegh (1898–1958), British Army Second World War major-general
 Vyvyan Holland (1886–1967), English author/translator, second son of Oscar Wilde
 Vyvyan Holt (1896–1960), British soldier, diplomat, and Oriental scholar
 Vyvyan Pope (1891–1941), British Army Second World War lieutenant-general

Vyvian
 Vyvian Pike (born 1969), English cricketer

Stage name or nickname
"Vivian", a nickname given to Chaim Herzog in the 1940s
 Vivian Stanshall, stage name of Victor Anthony Stanshall (1943–1995), English comedic musician
 The Vivienne, stage name of James Lee Williams, British drag queen

Feminine given name

Late antiquity
The spelling of these names may differ depending on tradition.
Saint Vibiana (3rd century)
Saint Vivian (4th century)

Vivian
Vivian Inez Archibald (born 1945), British Virgin Islander politician
Vivian Bang (born 1983), American actress
 Vivian Cheruiyot (born 1983), Kenyan long-distance runner
 Vivian Chukwuemeka (born 1975), Nigerian shot putter
 Vivian Dandridge (1921–1991), American actress
 Vivian Flowers (born c. 1969), American politician
 Vivian Gornick (born 1935), American author
 Vivian Green (born 1979), American R&B singer
 Vivi Janiss (1911–1988), American actress
 Vivian Joseph (born 1948), American figure skater
 Vivian Kong (born 1994), Hong Kong fencer
 Vivian Kubrick (born 1960), American-born English filmmaker and composer
 Vivian Maier (1926–2009), American photographer
 Vivian Nouri known professionally as NOURI (born 1993), New Zealand recording artist of Kurdish descent
 Vivian Oparah (born 1996), British actress
 Vivian Vance (1909–1979), American actress

Vivien
 Vivien Bishop (born 1945), New Zealand painter
 Vivien Cardone (born 1993), American actress
 Vivien Duffield (born 1946), British philanthropist
 Vivien Hailstone (1913–2000), Native American designer and educator
 Vivien Kirk, New Zealand mathematician
 Vivien Knight (1953–2009), British art historian and gallerist
 Vivien Leigh, born Vivian Mary Hartley (1913–1967), English Academy Award-winning actress
 Vivien Neves (1947–2002), British glamour model
 Vivien Thomas (1910–1985), American laboratory supervisor

Viviane
Viv Albertine (born 1954), British guitarist, songwriter and author
Viviane Araújo (born 1986), Brazilian mixed martial artist
Viviane Bampassy, Senegalese politician
Viviane Biviga, Gabonese politician
Vivi Fernandez (born 1977), Brazilian model
Viviane Hagner (born 1977), German violinist
Viviane Ndour, Senegalese singer
Viviane Romance (1912–1991), French actress

Vivianne
Vivianne Blanlot (born 1956), Chilean economist and politician
Vivianne Crowley, English author, university lecturer, psychologist, and teacher of the Wiccan religion
Vivianne Fock Tave, Seychellois diplomat
Vivianne Miedema (born 1996), Dutch forward footballer
Vivianne Pasmanter (born 1971), Brazilian actress
Viviane Ventura, Mother of Sheherazade Goldsmith and author

Vivienne
 Vivienne Boyd (1926–2011), New Zealand politician
 Vivienne Binns (born 1940), Australian artist
 Vivienne Chandler (born 1947), French actress and photographer
 Vivienne Faull (born 1955), British Anglican bishop and Lord Spiritual
 Vivienne Goonewardene (1916–1996), Sri Lankan politician
 Vivienne Haigh-Wood Eliot (1888–1947), first wife of poet and writer T. S. Eliot 
 Vivienne Malone-Mayes (1932–1995), American mathematician and professor
 Vivienne Medrano (born 1992), Salvadorian American animator, illustrator, comic creator, and voice actress
 Vivienne Ming, American theoretical neuroscientist and artificial intelligence expert
 Vivienne Osborne (1896–1961), American stage and film actress
 Vivienne (1889–1982), British photographer and singer
 Vivienne Pinay, Filipino-American drag queen
 Vivienne Roumani (born 1950), Libyan filmmaker
 Vivienne Segal (1897–1992) American actress
 Vivienne de Silva Boralessa (1930–2017), Sri Lankan singer
 Vivienne Spence (born 1965), Jamaican track and field athlete
 Vivienne Trumpy (1917–1975), stage name Vivi Gioi, Italian actress
 Vivienne de Watteville (1900–1957), United Kingdom author
 Vivienne Westwood (1941–2022), English fashion designer

Vyvienne
 Vyvienne Long, Irish musician

Vyvyan
 Vyvyan Lorrayne, South African ballerina

Vyvyane
 Vyvyane Loh, Chinese Hui-Shien, Malaysian-American novelist, choreographer, and physician

Hypocoristic Vivi (used as given name in Scandinavia)
 Vivi Bach (1939–2013), Danish actress and singer
 Vivi Flindt (born 1943), Danish ballerina
 Vivi Friedman (1967–2012), Finnish film director
 Vivi Krogh (born 1919), Norwegian anti-immigration activist

As a pseudonym or adopted name
Vivian Chow (born 1967), Hong Kong singer and actress
Vivian Hsu (born 1975), Taiwanese singer, actress and model
Vivienne Poy (born 1941), politician
Vivienne Tam (born 1957), Hong Kong fashion designer
Vivean Gray, British TV and film actress (adopted name of Jean Vivra Gray)

Fictional characters
 Vivien, the Lady of the Lake, in Tennyson's Idylls of the King (1859) and elsewhere
 Vivian Kudo (Yukiko Kudo), in Manga series Case Closed
 Vivian Grey, hero of Benjamin Disraeli's eponymous first novel, published in 1826
 Vivien de Monbranc, hero of a 12th-century French chanson de geste
 Vivian Alamain, on the American soap opera Days of Our Lives
Vivien Harmon, one of the main characters in the American TV show American Horror Story
Vivian Volkoff, daughter of the main antagonist of Chuck'''s season four
Vivian Joan Abbot Walker, one of the main characters of the novel Divine Secrets of the Ya-Ya Sisterhood (1996) by Rebecca Wells
Vyvyan Basterd, character in the British comedy series The Young OnesVivian Ward, the title character in the film Pretty Woman (1990)
Vivian Banks, or "Aunt Viv" character in the American comedy series The Fresh Prince of Bel-AirVivian Sternwood, General Sternwood's oldest daughter and a key figure in Raymond Chandler's crime novel The Big Sleep (1939)
Vivian Smith-Smythe-Smith, a character from the Monty Python sketch "Upper Class Twit of the Year"
Vivienne, a character from the video game Dragon Age: Inquisition who can be recruited as a party member
Princess Vivian, from the American animated television series Sofia the First; first appeared in The Shy PrincessVyvyan Ayrs, a famous but reclusive male composer in David Mitchell's novel Cloud Atlas (2004)
Vivian (Paper Mario), one of the player's partners in the role-playing video game Paper Mario: The Thousand-Year DoorVivienne Deering, a character in British police drama No OffenceVivian "Viv", a supporting character in Freeform's canceled show SirenVivian "Viv" Turner, Timmy Turner's cousin, and the main protagonist in The Fairly OddParents: Fairly Odder''

Notes

English feminine given names
English-language masculine given names
English masculine given names
English-language unisex given names
English unisex given names